George Adams (August 1, 1784 – August 14, 1844) was a United States district judge of the United States District Court for the District of Mississippi, the United States District Court for the Northern District of Mississippi and the United States District Court for the Southern District of Mississippi.

Education and career

Born on August 1, 1784, in Lynchburg, Virginia, Adams read law in 1810. He entered private practice in Frankfort, Kentucky from 1810 to 1825. He was a member of the Kentucky House of Representatives from 1810 to 1811, and in 1814. He resumed private practice in Natchez, Mississippi from 1825 to 1827, and from 1829 to 1830. He was Attorney General of Mississippi from 1828 to 1829. He was the United States Attorney for the District of Mississippi from 1830 to 1836.

Federal judicial service

Adams was nominated by President Andrew Jackson on January 12, 1836, to a seat on the United States District Court for the District of Mississippi vacated by Judge Powhatan Ellis. He was confirmed by the United States Senate on January 20, 1836, and received his commission the same day. Adams was reassigned by operation of law to the United States District Court for the Northern District of Mississippi and the United States District Court for the Southern District of Mississippi on June 18, 1838, to a new joint seat authorized by 5 Stat. 247. His service terminated on September 30, 1838, due to his resignation.

Later career and death

Following his resignation from the federal bench, Adams resumed private practice in Jackson, Mississippi from 1838 to 1844. He died on August 14, 1844, in Jackson.

Family

Two of Adams' sons were Generals in the Confederate Armies: William Wirt Adams and Daniel Weisiger Adams.

References

Sources
 

Judges of the United States District Court for the District of Mississippi
Judges of the United States District Court for the Southern District of Mississippi
Judges of the United States District Court for the Northern District of Mississippi
United States federal judges appointed by Andrew Jackson
19th-century American judges
United States Attorneys for the District of Mississippi
Members of the Kentucky House of Representatives
Politicians from Lynchburg, Virginia
Lawyers from Jackson, Mississippi
1784 births
1844 deaths
United States federal judges admitted to the practice of law by reading law